The 1983–84 North West Counties Football League was the second in the history of the North West Counties Football League, a football competition in England. Teams were divided into three divisions.

Division One

Division One featured 3 new teams:

 Netherfield, relegated from the Northern Premier League
 Radcliffe Borough promoted as champions from Division Two
 Caernarfon Town promoted as runners-up from Division Two

League table

Division Two

Division Two featured 3 new teams:

 Nantwich Town, relegated from Division One
 Colne Dynamoes promoted as champions from Division Three
 Warrington Town promoted as runners-up from Division Three

League table

Division Three

Division Three featured 3 new teams:

 Padiham, relegated from Division Two
 Grasmere Rovers, joined from the Manchester League, with a name change to Cheadle Town
 Urmston Town, joined from the Manchester League

League table

Promotion and relegation

Division One
Ashton United and Darwen were relegated to Division Two.

Division two
Division Two champions Fleetwood Town and second placed Eastwood Hanley were promoted to Division One while Prescot BI left the League at the end of the season. Lytham were relegated to Division Three.

Division Three
Division Three champions Clitheroe and second placed Padiham were promoted to Division Two while Vulcan Newton left the League at the end of the season, to be replaced by newly admitted Kirkby Town and Colwyn Bay.

External links 
 North West Counties Football League Tables at RSSSF

North West Counties Football League seasons
7